Walter Bagehot (3 February 1826 – 24 March 1877) was an English journalist, businessman, and essayist, who wrote extensively about government, economics, literature and race. He is known for co-founding the National Review in 1855, and for his works The English Constitution and Lombard Street: A Description of the Money Market (1873).

Life
Bagehot was born in Langport, Somerset, England, on 3 February 1826. His father, Thomas Watson Bagehot, was managing director and vice-chairman of Stuckey's Bank. He attended University College London (UCL), where he studied mathematics and, in 1848, earned a master's degree in moral philosophy. Bagehot was called to the bar by Lincoln's Inn, but preferred to join his father in 1852 in his family's shipping and banking business.

In 1858, Bagehot married Elizabeth (Eliza) Wilson (1832–1921), whose father, James Wilson, was the founder and owner of The Economist. The couple were happily married until Bagehot's untimely death at age 51, but had no children.  A collection of their love-letters was published in 1933.

Journalism
In 1855, Bagehot founded the National Review with his friend Richard Holt Hutton. In 1861, he became editor-in-chief of The Economist. In the 17 years he served as its editor, Bagehot expanded the reporting of politics by The Economist, and increased its influence among policy-makers.  He was widely accepted by the British establishment and was elected to the Athenaeum in 1875.

Works

In 1867, Bagehot wrote The English Constitution, a book that explores the nature of the constitution of the United Kingdom, specifically its Parliament and monarchy. It appeared at the same time that Parliament enacted the Reform Act of 1867, requiring Bagehot to write an extended introduction to the second edition which appeared in 1872.

Bagehot also wrote Physics and Politics (1872), in which he examines how civilisations sustain themselves, arguing that, in their earliest phase, civilisations are very much in opposition to the values of modern liberalism, insofar as they are sustained by conformism and military success but, once they are secured, it is possible for them to mature into systems which allow for greater diversity and freedom.

His viewpoint was based on his distinction between the qualities of an "accomplished man" and those of a "rude man", which he considered to be the result of iterative inheritances by which the "nervous organisation" of the individual became increasingly refined down through the generations. He regarded that distinction as a moral achievement whereby, through the actions of the will, the "accomplished" elite was able to morally differentiate themselves from "rude men" by a "hereditary drill". He equally applied such reasoning to develop a form of pseudoscientific racism, whereby those of mixed race lacked any "inherited creed" or "fixed traditional sentiments" upon which, he considered, human nature depended.

He attempted to provide empirical support for his views by citing John Lubbock and Edward Tylor although, in their writings on human evolution, neither of them accepted arguments for innate hereditary differences, as opposed to cultural inheritance. Tylor, in particular, rejected Bagehot's view of the centrality of physical heredity, or that the modern "savage" mind had become "tattooed over with monstrous images" by which base instincts had been preserved in crevices, as opposed to accomplished European man, for whom such instincts had been smoothed away through the inherited will to exercise reason.

In Lombard Street: A Description of the Money Market (1873) Bagehot seeks to explain the world of finance and banking. His observations on finance are often cited by central bankers, most recently in the wake of the global financial crisis which began in 2007. Of particular importance is "Bagehot's Dictum" that in times of financial crisis central banks should lend freely to solvent depository institutions, yet only against sound collateral and at interest rates high enough to dissuade those borrowers that are not genuinely in need.

Legacy

Bagehot never fully recovered from a bout of pneumonia he suffered in 1867, and he died in 1877 from complications of what was said to be a cold. Collections of Bagehot's literary, political, and economic essays were published after his death. Their subjects ranged from Shakespeare and Disraeli to the price of silver. Every year, the British Political Studies Association awards the Walter Bagehot Prize for the best dissertation in the field of government and public administration.

Minor planet 2901 Bagehot, discovered by Luboš Kohoutek, is named in his honor.

The Economist carries a weekly current affairs commentary entitled "Bagehot", which is named in his honour and is described as "an analysis of British life and politics, in the tradition of Walter Bagehot". 
, the column has been written by Duncan Robinson, political editor of the publication.

Major publications
 (1848). "Principles of Political Economy," The Prospective Review, Vol. 4, No. 16, pp. 460–502.
 (1858). Estimates of Some Englishmen and Scotchmen.
 (1867; second edition, 1872). The English Constitution. (online)
 (1872). Physics and Politics (online).
 (1873). Lombard Street: A Description of the Money Market. (online)
 (1875). "A New Standard of Value," The Economist, Vol. 33, No. 1682, pp. 1361–63.
 (1877). Some Articles on the Depreciation of Silver and on Topics Connected with It.
 (1879). Literary Studies.
 Vol I
 Vol III
 (1880). Economic Studies.
 (1881). Biographical Studies.
 (1885). The Postulates of English Political Economy.
 (1889). The Works of Walter Bagehot.
 (1933). The Love Letters of Walter Bagehot and Eliza Wilson (with his spouse).

References

Bibliography
 Barrington, Emilie Isabel Wilson (1914). Life of Walter Bagehot. London: Longmans, Green and Co.
 Buchan, Alastair (1960). The Spare Chancellor: The Life of Walter Bagehot. East Lansing: Michigan State University Press.
 Grant, James (2019). Bagehot: The Life and Times of the Greatest Victorian. New York: W. W. Norton & Company.
 Orel, Harold (1984). Victorian Literary Critics. London: Palgrave Macmillan.
 Sisson C.H. (1972). The Case of Walter Bagehot. London: Faber and Faber Ltd.
 Stevas, Norman (1959). Walter Bagehot a Study of His Life and Thought. Bloomington: Indiana University Press.
 Sullivan, Harry R. (1975). Walter Bagehot. Boston: Twayne Publishers.

Further reading

 Barrington, Emilie Isabel Wilson (1933). The Love-letters of Walter Bagehot and Eliza Wilson. London: Faber & Faber
 Baumann, Arthur Anthony (1916). "Walter Bagehot." In: Persons & Politics of the Transition. London: Macmillan & Co., pp. 121–50
 Birrell, Augustine (1922). "Walter Bagehot." In: The Collected Essays and Addresses of the Rt. Hon. Augustine Birrell, Vol. 2. London: J.M. Dent & Sons, pp. 213–35
 Briggs, Asa, “Trollope, Bagehot, and the English Constitution,” in Briggs, Victorian People (1955) pp. 87–115. online
 Brogan, Hugh (1977). "America and Walter Bagehot," Journal of American Studies, Vol. 11, No. 3, pp. 335–56
 Brinton, Crane (1962). "Walter Bagehot." In: English Plolitical Thought in the 19th Century. New York: Harper Torchbooks
 Buchan, Alastair. "Walter Bagehot." History Today (Nov 1954) 4#11 pp 764–770
 Clinton, David (2003). "'Dash and Doubt': Walter Bagehot and International Restraint," The Review of Politics, Vol. 65, No. 1, pp. 89–109
 Cousin, John William (1910). A Short Biographical Dictionary of English Literature. London: J.M. Dent & Sons, p. 20
 Easton, David (1949). "Walter Bagehot and Liberal Realism," The American Political Science Review, Vol. 43, No. 1, pp. 17–37
 Edwards, Ruth Dudley (1993). The Pursuit of Reason: The Economist 1843–1993. London: Hamish Hamilton
 Grant Duff, M.E. (1903). "Walter Bagehot: His Life and Works, 1826–1877." In: Out of the Past. London: John Murray, pp. 1–34
 Halsted, John B. (1958). "Walter Bagehot on Toleration," Journal of the History of Ideas, Vol. 19, No. 1, pp. 119–28
 Hanley, Brian (2004). "'The Greatest Victorian' in the New Century: The Enduring Relevance of Walter Bagehot's Commentary on Literature, Scholarship, and Public Life", Papers on Language and Literature, Vol. 40, No. 2, pp. 167–98
 Irvine, William (1939). Walter Bagehot. London: Longmans, Green and Co.
 Kolbe, F.C. (1908). "Walter Bagehot: An Appreciation," The Irish Monthly, Vol. 36, No. 419, pp. 282–87
 Lanchester, John, "The Invention of Money:  How the heresies of two bankers became the basis of our modern economy", The New Yorker, 5 & 12 August 2019, pp. 28–31.
 Morgan, Forrest (1995). Collected Works of Walter Bagehot. Routledge
 Ostlund, Leonard A. (1956). "Walter Bagehot—Pioneer Social Psychology Theorist," Social Science, Vol. 31, No. 2, pp. 107–11
 Spring, David (1976). "Walter Bagehot and Deference," The American Historical Review, Vol. 81, No. 3, pp. 524–31
 Stephen, Leslie (1907). "Walter Bagehot." In: Studies of a Biographer, Vol. 3. New York: G.P. Putnam's Sons, pp. 144–74
 Stevas, Norman, ed. (1986). The Collected Works of Walter Bagehot: Volumes 1–15. New York: Oxford University Press
 Westwater, S.A.M. (1977). "Walter Bagehot: A Reassessment," The Antioch Review, Vol. 35, No. 1, pp. 39–49
 Wilson, Woodrow (1895). "A Literary Politician," The Atlantic Monthly, Vol. 76, No. 457, pp. 668–80
 Wilson, Woodrow (1898). "A Wit and a Seer," The Atlantic Monthly, Vol. 82, No. 492, pp. 527–40

External links

 
 
 Works by Walter Bagehot at Hathi Trust
 Walter Bagehot: at McMaster University Archive for the History of Economic Thought.
 

British political scientists
English constitutionalists
Alumni of University College London
Members of Lincoln's Inn
The Economist editors
English essayists
People from Langport
1826 births
1877 deaths
English historical school of economics
Proponents of scientific racism